Robert Kristo (born 14 May 1993) is a Croatian American footballer who plays as a forward for the St. Louis Ambush of the Major Arena Soccer League.

Early life
Kristo was born to Bosnian Croat parents in Bosnia and Herzegovina. His family moved to the United States during the Bosnian War. He is a practicing Catholic. He grew up in St. Louis, Missouri and attended Saint Louis University.

Professional
Kristo joined USL Championship side North Carolina FC on 23 January 2019.

After the team moved to USL League One for the 2021 season, Kristo resigned with the team.

Kristo returned to his hometown of St. Louis in late 2021, signing with the Major Arena Soccer League's St. Louis Ambush.

References

External links
 
 
Profile - North Carolina FC
Profile - Columbus Crew

1993 births
Living people
People from Travnik
Croats of Bosnia and Herzegovina
Bosnia and Herzegovina emigrants to the United States
Soccer players from St. Louis
Association football forwards
Bosnia and Herzegovina footballers
American soccer players
Saint Louis Billikens men's soccer players
A.C. Tuttocuoio 1957 San_Miniato players
VfL Osnabrück players
North Carolina FC players
Columbus Crew draft picks
All-American men's college soccer players
Serie C players
3. Liga players
USL Championship players
Bosnia and Herzegovina expatriate footballers
Expatriate footballers in Italy
Bosnia and Herzegovina expatriate sportspeople in Italy
Expatriate footballers in Germany
Bosnia and Herzegovina expatriate sportspeople in Germany
St. Louis Ambush (2013–) players
Catholics from Missouri
Major Arena Soccer League players